The Northeastern School District (also known as Northeastern York School District) is a midsized, suburban public school district in York County in the South Central region of Pennsylvania. Municipalities served by the district include: Mount Wolf, Manchester, East Manchester Township, York Haven, Goldsboro, Newberry Township, and Conewago Township. According to 2000 federal census data, it served a resident population of 18,282 people. In 2010, the district's population had grown to 23,399 people. In 2009, the district residents’ per capita income was $18,799, while the median family income was $48,744. In the Commonwealth, the median family income was $49,501 and the United States median family income was $49,445, in 2010.

Northeastern School District operates eight schools: 
Conewago Elementary School
Mount Wolf Elementary School
Orendorf Elementary School
York Haven Elementary School
Shallow Brook Intermediate School
Spring Forge Intermediate School
Northeastern Middle School
Northeastern Senior High School.

Extracurriculars
Northeastern School District offers a variety of clubs, activities and an extensive sports program.

Sports
The district funds:

High School Sports

Boys 

Baseball – AAAAA
Basketball- AAAAA
Cross country – AAA
Football – AAAAA
Golf – AAA
Soccer – AAAA
Swimming and diving – AAA
Tennis – AAA
Track and field – AAA
Volleyball – AAA
Wrestling – AAA

Girls

Basketball – AAAAA
Cheerleading – AAAAAA
Cross country – AAA
Field hockey – AA
Soccer (fall season)) – AAAA
Softball – AAAAA
Swimming and diving – AAA
Girls' tennis – AAA
Track and field – AAA
Volleyball – AAAA
Golf –

Middle School Sports 

Boys

Basketball
Cross country
Football
Soccer
Track and field
Wrestling	
Swimming
Volleyball

Girls

Basketball
Cross country
Field hockey
Soccer (fall)
Softball 
Track and field
Volleyball
Swimming

According to PIAA directory February 2019

Northeastern tied the PIAA record for consecutive boys' volleyball state championships by winning its sixth consecutive title Saturday, on June 9, 2018, in Rec Hall at Pennsylvania State University in State College, Pennsylvania. Northeastern rallied for a 3–1 win over Manheim Central to claim their sixth PIAA championship in a row.

References

External links 

 District Website
 Northeastern HS Website
 Northeastern MS Website
 Shallow Brook Intermediate School Website
 Spring Forge Intermediate School Website
 Conewago Elementary School Website
 Mount Wolf Elementary School Website
 Orendorf Elementary School Website
 York Haven Elementary School Website

Susquehanna Valley
Education in Harrisburg, Pennsylvania
School districts in York County, Pennsylvania